Mirchi Lanti Kurradu is a 2015 Indian Telugu-language romantic drama directed by Jayanag and starring Abijeet and Pragya Jaiswal with Rao Ramesh, Shakalaka Shankar, and Saptagiri among others in supporting roles.

Cast 
Abijeet as Siddhu
Pragya Jaiswal as Vasundhara 
Rao Ramesh
Shakalaka Shankar
Saptagiri
Fish Venkat
Prabhas Sreenu
Prudhviraj
Raghu Karumanchi
Nalla Venu

Production 

The film began production in April of 2014. Abijeet of Life Is Beautiful (2012) fame and Pragya Jaiswal were cast to play the lead roles. Abijeet worked out and sported six packs for the film.

Soundtrack 
The music was composed by J. B. The audio was scheduled to release on 19 October 2014; but was postponed to 13 November. The function was attended by Nandamuri Balakrishna. In a review of the film's soundtrack, a critic from The Times of India noted that "The album sticks to a formula and plays it safe with not much experimentation".

Release and reception 
The film was scheduled to release in December of 2014, but was delayed and ended up releasing in 2015.

Reception 
The Times of India gave the film a rating of two out of five stars and stated that "All in all, Mirchi Lanti Kurradu is a run of the mill love story with a predictable climax starring Abijeet Duddala and Pragya Jaiswal. There is nothing different in the film". 123Telugu rated the film 2.5/5 and termed the film a "routine love story." While praising the performances of the lead cast, the reviewer opined that the predictable screenplay has let down the film.

References 

2010s Telugu-language films
Indian romantic drama films
2015 romantic drama films